George Sidney Brydia (June 27, 1887 – June 5, 1970) was an American journalist, salesman, and politician.

Born in Saunemin, Illinois, Brydia was educated in the Fairbury, Illinois public schools. He worked as a reporter for the Fairbury Local Record newspaper and was a linotype operator. In 1908, Brydia moved to Prophetstown, Illinois and was a traveling salesman. He served as mayor of Prophetstown and was involved with the Republican Party. Brydia served in the Illinois House of Representatives from 1939 until 1965. Brydia died at Prophets Riverview Center in Prophetstown, Illinois.

Notes

External links

1887 births
1970 deaths
People from Livingston County, Illinois
People from Prophetstown, Illinois
Businesspeople from Illinois
Journalists from Illinois
Mayors of places in Illinois
Republican Party members of the Illinois House of Representatives
20th-century American politicians
20th-century American businesspeople